Mithapur railway station is a railway station on the Western Railway network in the state of Gujarat, India. Mithapur railway station is 10 km far away from Okha railway station. Passenger, Express, and Superfast trains halt here.

Trains 

The following Express and Superfast trains halt at Mithapur railway station in both directions:

 19251/52 Okha - Somnath Express
 22945/46 Okha - Mumbai Central Saurashtra Mail

References

See also
 Devbhumi Dwarka district

Railway stations in Devbhoomi Dwarka district
Rajkot railway division